Webster is sometimes used as a given name.  Notable people with the given name include:

Webster Anderson (1933–2003), American soldier and recipient of the Medal of Honor
Webster Hubbell (born 1948), Arkansas lawyer and politician associated with Bill Clinton
Webster Paulson (1837–1887), English civil engineer
Webster Slaughter (born 1964), former American football player in the National Football League
Webster Tarpley (born 1946), American author, journalist, lecturer, and critic of US foreign and domestic policy
Webster Young (1932–2003), American jazz musician

See also
Webster (surname), including a list of people with the surname